Sardarapat may refer to:

Places
Armavir, Armenia, Armenian city, until 1932 known as Sardarapat or Sardar-Apad
Sardarapat, Armenia, major village in Armavir Province, Armenia
Battle of Sardarabad (or Sardarapat), a battle of the Caucasus Campaign of World War I that took place near Sardarabad (modern-day Armavir), Armenia from May 21–29, 1918
Sardarapat Memorial, Armenian memorial complex dedicated to the Battle of Sardarapat above
Sardarapat Movement, Armenian social movement founded in 2009

Media
Sardarabad (weekly), an Armenian weekly published in Spanish and Armenian in Buenos, Aires, Argentina

See also
Sardarabad (disambiguation)